British Museum leather dressing has been used by many conservators since its publication to protect and conserve leather.

Formulation 
The basic formulation is:

The first three ingredients are mixed warm, then added to the cold solvent and allowed to cool while constantly stirring. Care should be exercised, as hexane is highly flammable.

Variations 
There are several variations in the formulation.

Sometimes 60% of the lanolin was replaced by neatsfoot oil. 

One disadvantage of the solvent hexane is its tendency to evaporate rapidly. Before the fat/hexane mixture has been able to penetrate deep into the leather, the hexane evaporates to the surface of the leather, taking most of the fat with it. 

While beeswax prevents air pollutants from penetrating the leather, it does this by closing off the leather, thus disturbing the water balance and causing the leather to dry out.

In use 
The British Museum leather dressing was part of an elaborate leather conservation programme. Other steps entailed cleaning the leather, if necessary with soap and water, and applying an aqueous solution of 7% potassium lactate as a buffer. A warning was given about the dangers of using too much lactate, which made books sticky and could cause fungal growth. The books had to be absolutely dry when the leather dressing was applied.

Apply sparingly to the leather and rub well. Wait two days, then polish the treated leather with a soft cloth. Very hard leather can be soaked in a solution of one part British Museum leather dressing: three parts Stoddard solvent. 

British Museum leather dressing darkens leather, but it is a treatment with a good success record.

References

Leather dressing
Leather crafting
Conservation and restoration materials